Benjamin Hannestad (born 14 February 1997) is a Danish tennis player.

On the junior tour, Hannestad has a career high junior ranking of 45, achieved in October 2015.

Playing for Denmark in Davis Cup, Hannestad has a win–loss record of 1–1.

See also
List of Denmark Davis Cup team representatives

External links 
 
 
 

1997 births
Living people
Danish male tennis players
Sportspeople from Copenhagen
Sportspeople from Bradenton, Florida
Arizona State Sun Devils men's tennis players
Miami Hurricanes men's tennis players
21st-century Danish people